Tennis at the 2017 European Youth Summer Olympic Festival was held at Olympic Sports Park, Győr, Hungary from 24 to 29 July 2017.

Tennis had doubles and singles events for men and women competition.

Medalists

Medal table

References

2017 European Youth Summer Olympic Festival
European Youth Summer Olympic Festival
2017
2017 European Youth